Flora Wiegmann (born 1976 Lincoln, Nebraska) is an American dancer, choreographer and filmmaker based in Los Angeles.

Education
Wiegmann earned her dance BA from Columbia College Chicago and her MFA from UCLA's Department of Art and Architecture.

Career
Wiegmann has exhibited extensively in the US and internationally in places such as the Whitney Museum of American Art, The Kitchen, Institute of Contemporary Art, Philadelphia, Contemporary Arts Museum Houston, the David Roberts (art collector) Art Foundation, Camden Arts Centre in London, and the Walter Phillips Gallery in Banff, Canada.

Wiegmann's work incorporates film, site-specificity, endurance and collaboration with visual artists such as Fritz Haeg, Drew Heitzler, Silke Otto-Knapp, Alix Lambert, Margo Victor, and Andrea Zittel.

References

1976 births
Living people
American choreographers
American female dancers
Dancers from Nebraska
American filmmakers
Columbia College Chicago alumni
Artists from Lincoln, Nebraska
People from Los Angeles
21st-century American women